Randonnée (French for excursion) can refer to:

 Randonneuring, an organized long-distance bicycle ride
 Isle of Wight Randonnée, a yearly cycling event held on the Isle of Wight
 Randonnée skiing, a form of backcountry skiing